Evil Star is the name of two fictional characters appearing in DC Comics.

Evil Star may also refer to:

 Evil Star (album), a 2004 power metal album by Wolf
 Evil Star (novel), the second book in The Power of Five series